Xylocaryon is an extinct genus of plants in the family Proteaceae. The sole species is Xylocaryon lockii from south-eastern Australia, described from fossilised fruits found at Nintingbool near Ballarat, Victoria and Flinders Island in Tasmania. The fruit structure suggests a close relationship with the extant genus Eidothea.

References 

Monotypic Proteaceae genera
Prehistoric angiosperm genera
Proteaceae